Walter is a Muppet character that first appeared in the 2011 film The Muppets. Performed by Peter Linz, he is one of the film's main characters, along with Kermit the Frog and the rest of the Muppets. Walter also appears in the 2014 sequel film, Muppets Most Wanted; though still a major character, he plays a smaller role than he does in the previous film.

The character was received positively by most critics and fans, praising his storyline in The Muppets. Screen Rant's Ben Kendrick wrote, "Even Walter, despite being the new Muppet on the block, holds his own alongside his non-human friends, and will no doubt be a fan-favorite for years to come." E! referred to the addition of Walter as "an inspired choice". Betsy Sharkey of the Los Angeles Times said that Walter "is adorably insecure and a good addition to the house that Jim Henson built, which included so many iconic characters."

Biography
During his adolescence in Smalltown, Walter frequently watched The Muppet Show, collecting memorabilia and finding the cast as a source of inspiration during his upbringing—which is why he often refers to himself as the "world’s biggest Muppet fan". While on vacation in Los Angeles, Walter assists the Muppets in regaining both their popularity with the public and control of their acquired studios from oil baron Tex Richman.

Later in the film, Walter starts to question whether he is man, which he was believed to be his entire life, or actually a Muppet, which was why he always felt a strong connection towards them. This emotion eventually leads him to sing the Academy Award-winning song, "Man or Muppet", where the human version of Walter is portrayed by actor Jim Parsons. The scene is pivotal to the character's arc as it resolves Walter's internal issues with himself. The character's solo act of whistling in the telethon's finale was performed by musician Andrew Bird. At the conclusion of the film, Walter deduces that he is a Muppet, adopts whistling as his sole talent and joins the group as their newest member.

A 2010 article from Entertainment Weekly described Walter by writing;

Meet the newest member of the Muppet repertory company: Walter, a sweet, slightly naive twenty-something every-puppet who, in the movie, is the best friend and roommate of Jason Segel's character, Gary. Both Gary and Walter are die-hard Muppet fans. "Walter is the kind of guy who faints when he sees Kermit," [James] Bobin says. Of course, Walter's Muppet fandom is complicated by the fact that he is a Muppet himself. "Walter has a bit of a self-confidence issue because he's the only person like him that he's seen aside from the Muppets," Segel explains. "His dream is to meet the Muppets and be around people who are like him." When Gary and Walter learn that the Muppet Theater is in danger of being torn down, they set out to save it by reuniting Kermit, Piggy and the entire troupe to stage an old-fashioned extravaganza.

—Entertainment Weekly

Development

Characterization
In the process of conceptualizing Walter, Nicholas Stoller said; "We wanted a simple character, who was pure innocence and pure enthusiasm as an entry point for kids who aren't necessarily as familiar with The Muppets as their parents." Jason Segel, added: "He's a stand-in for me, a hardcore Muppet fan who wants to know what the hell happened to them." He also revealed a shared ambition with the character; "He sets out to make them as famous as they once were — which was sort of our goal in making this movie." Stoller and Segel's screenplay had described Walter as the adopted younger brother of Gary and had set Walter's age to be approximately 30 years old.

Much to the producers' surprise, Disney granted them the creative license to conceive a new Muppet without any initial marketing research, a technique Disney often employs when creating characters for their consumer products franchisees. Segel and Stoller, however, were only responsible for creating Walter's personality and character traits—his physical appearance was crafted by the Muppets Studio and Puppet Heap.

Peter Linz came to the producers' attention after a screenplay read-through, where he assisted fellow Muppet performer Eric Jacobson. The producers called Linz, asking if he were interested in auditioning for the role. Linz, however, did not initially win over the film's producers, and he was asked to audition again. During his second audition, Linz was told to emulate actor Michael Cera in his demeanor, because the producers wanted Walter to be quiet and shy, similar to the way Cera acts. Linz received the role after completing his second audition, where he improvised dialogue with Segel and performed several music duets, including "Love Will Keep Us Together". As Walter's characterization became more defined, Linz identified a comparative bond between him and Walter; "The character of Walter hits really close to home for me. I’ve always been an enormous Muppet fan who dreamed of one day working with the Muppets, and that’s basically who Walter is." Producer Todd Lieberman remarked, "The emotional core of the movie is Walter. The idea is that he's not comfortable where he is now but he ends up finding a place where he's comfortable at. That's a really great lesson."

Design
In the screenplay for The Muppets, Stoller and Segel described Walter as having the feel of "an old dishrag" that wore a blue suit.
The writers stated that they wanted Walter to be small, because even though he was an adult, he needed to feel like he was "out of place in the human world." Walter's actual height has been recorded as being 18 inches tall. Paul Andrejco, president of Puppet Heap, showed the producers 14 different iterations of the basic puppet, each of them different in size and shape. Andrejco and the producers had to choose from 25 different possibilities for color and texture, ranging from "pink and scruffy to orange-y speckly to flat gray". Lieberman spoke about how Walter couldn't be a joke, and said, "At the end of the movie, you want to shed a tear for him when he finds his place."

Appearances
Walter also appeared with the rest of the Muppets on several promotional posters and images. He also appeared several times to promote the film, including appearing on Late Night with Jimmy Fallon, along with Jason Segel. Walter appeared as part of the Muppets ensemble in Cee Lo Green's "All I Need Is Love" in 2012. He also appeared in Kirk Scroggs’ “Tales Of A Sixth-Grade Muppet” book series.

Filmography
The Muppets (2011)
Lady Gaga and the Muppets Holiday Spectacular (2013) (TV)
Muppets Most Wanted (2014)
Disney Drive-On with The Muppets (2014) (Web)
The Muppets (2015) (TV) (Presentation Pilot Only)
The Muppets Take the Bowl (2017)
The Muppets Take the O2 (2018)
Muppets Now (2020)
Muppets Haunted Mansion (2021)

References

External links
  at Disney.com
 Walter on IMDb

Film characters introduced in 2011
The Muppets characters